Shehana Vithana (born 31 March 1999) is a Sri Lankan born Australian professional squash player .She achieved her highest career PSA singles ranking of 119 in October 2018 as a part of the 2018-19 PSA World Tour.

Biography 
She was born and raised up in Colombo, Sri Lanka, when she started playing the sport of squash at the age of 9. She studied at the Holy Family Convent in Bambalapitiya till Year 8 when she moved to Sydney, Australia.

Career 
Shehana emerged in youth level and became Australia's number one ranked squash player in the U19 category. She won U17 Girl's Squash Championships at the Australian Junior Squash Championships in 2015. She also took part in the 2017 Women's World Junior Squash Championships and World University Championships in 2018. She joined the Professional Squash Association in 2017.

References

External links 

 Profile at PSA
 

1999 births
Living people
Australian female squash players
Sportspeople from Colombo
Alumni of Holy Family Convent, Bambalapitiya
Australian Catholic University alumni
Sri Lankan expatriates in Australia